The Hero of the People was the highest title bestowed upon the citizens of the People's Socialist Republic of Albania.

Creation
Founded on July 9, 1945, the title was awarded by the Presidium of the People's Assembly acting on a recommendation from the government. The main recipients were soldiers, officers, warrant officers, and generals in both the armed forces and in the Ministry of the Interior. The motives for issuing the award were as follows:

 For heroic acts in the accomplishment of duties while defending the territory of Albania;
 For personal or collective heroic accomplishments in time of war; 
 For courage and resolve in directing military units to victory against the enemy under difficult combat situations, thus rendering a great service to the state and to the people.

Recipients
Recipients received a certificate of the title as well as the badge (medallion). The families of those recipients who died or were declared missing were entitled to a monthly pension of ALL 3,000, independent of any other pension or source of revenue. The recipient or the family of a recipient who was either killed or died had priority rights in the acquisition of travel vouchers. They also had priority entitlement in admission to all schools or courses of special instruction. Upon the death of the recipient, the medal itself would be returned to the Presidium of the People's Assembly, while the certificate could be retained by the family as a memento.

A total of 151 people received the title. Enver Hoxha was given the award twice. In the list below, those marked with an asterisk had their titles revoked when they were later branded as “enemies of socialism” and were eventually executed. Hoxha himself and other leaders of the communist party had their titles revoked by decree No.1018, issued on 13 February 1995, for crimes against the people.

Posthumous recipients

Asim Aliko 
Manush Alimani 
Shyqyri Alimerko 
Llambro Andoni 
Ramiz Aranitasi 
Vangjel Argjiri 
Muzafer Asqeri 
Fuat Babani
Koçi Bako

Memo Bejko
 
Xheladin Beqiri
Fato Berberi
Bardhok Biba
Isa Boletini
Hyqmet Buzi 
Hajredin Bylishi 
Ylbere Bylybashi 
Shkurte Cara (Skuraj) 
Riza Cerova
Bajram Curri
Skënder Çaçi

Hysen Çino
Reshit Çollaku
Zonja Çurre
Ilia Kici (Dashi) 
Ndoc Deda
Veli Dedi
Rexh Delia
Ali Demi
Qeriba Derri 
Gjok Doçi

Inajete Dumi 
Emin Duraku
Mihal Duri 
Hajdar Dushi 
Abdyl Elmazi 
Laze Ferraj 
Abdyl Frashëri
Musa Fratari 
Shote Galica
Liri Gero
Hasan Gërxhaliu 
Meleq Gosnishti 
Mihal Grameno 
Luigj Gurakuqi
Jaho Gjoliku 
Ded Gjo Luli
Naim Gjylbegu 
Met Hasa 
Ahmet Haxhia 
Dervish Hekali 

Vehbi Hoxha 
Shyqyri Ishmi 
Fran Ivanaj
Tuk Jakova
Shenjaze Juka 
Mustafa Kaçaçi
Xhemal Kada 
Branko Kadia
Dino Kalenja
Zija Kambo

Kajo Karafili
Ali Kelmendi
Myslym Keta
Zaho Koka
Persefoni Kokëdhima 
Tom Kola
Teki Kolaneci 
Rexhep Kolli
Sado Kosheno 
Spiro Kote
Vojo Kushi
Vasil Laçi
Zigur Lelo 
Hydajet Lezha 
Mbrik Lokja
Nuri Luçi

Misto Mame
Dile Marku 
Baba Faja Martaneshi
Xhoxhi Martini 
Theodhori Mastora 
Mustafa Matohiti 
Ndoc Mazi
Kanan Maze 
Emine Metaj 
Ram Metaliaj
Memo Meto 
Pal Mëlyshi
Fejzi Micoli
Jordan Misja
Kastriot Muço
Maliq Muço
Sali Murati (Vranishti) 
Selam Musai
Bule Naipi
Kozma Naska
Nik Ndreka 
Kozma Nushi 
Estref Osoja
Hibe Palikuqi 
Llazo Palluqi 

Mine Peza 
Myslim Peza
Hekuran Pobrati 
Muhamet Prodani 
Nimete Progonati 
Ismail Qemali
Fahri Ramadani 
Perlat Rexhepi
Ndreko Rino 
Avni Rustemi
Nazmi Rushiti 
Mumin Selami 
Çelo Sinani 
Çybra Sokoli
Mic Sokoli
Qemal Stafa
Sadik Stavaleci
Jorgo Sulioti
Vasil Shanto
Abaz Shehu

Myslym Shyri
Hajdar Tafa
Lefter Talo
Marte Tarazhi
Prenda Tarazhi
Bajo Topulli
Çerçiz Topulli
Bajram Tusha
Margarita Tutulani
Mujo Ulqinaku
Ramiz Varvarica
Themi Vaso
Zylyftar Veleshnja
Asim Vokshi
Sulejman Vokshi
Mitro Xhani
Mustafa Xhani (Baba Faja) 
Alim Xhelo (Tërbaçi)
Ajet Xhindolli 
Asim Zeneli

See also

Orders, decorations and medals of Albania
Hero of Socialist Labour

References

 
Awards established in 1945
Title
1945 establishments in Albania
Hero (title)